Andris Bērziņš (born August 4, 1951) is a Latvian politician born in Riga. He served as Prime Minister of Latvia from 5 May 2000 to 7 November 2002. He is a member of the Latvian Way political party.

Career 
He served as minister of labor from 1993 to 1994, deputy prime minister and minister of welfare from 1994 to 1995, and mayor of Riga from 1997 to 2000.

Andris Bērziņš is an Honorary Member of The International Raoul Wallenberg Foundation.

References 

1951 births
Living people
Politicians from Riga
Latvian Way politicians
Latvia's First Party/Latvian Way politicians
Prime Ministers of Latvia
Ministers of Welfare of Latvia
Deputies of the 9th Saeima
Deputies of the 10th Saeima
Mayors of Riga
University of Latvia alumni